Íþróttafélagið Vestri, known as Vestri, is an Icelandic multi-sports club based in northern Westfjords. The club was formed in 2016 from the merger of KFÍ (basketball), Skellur (volleyball), Sundfélagið Vestri (swim) and BÍ/Bolungarvík (football).

Basketball

Vestri's basketball was founded in 1965 as Körfuknattleiksfélag Ísafjarðar or KFÍ for short. Its men's team has played several seasons in the top-tier Úrvalsdeild karla, with their best season coming in 1998–1999 when it finished 3rd and made it to the semi-finals of the playoffs. Its women's team played in the top-tier Úrvalsdeild kvenna from 1999 to 2002, making the playoffs in 2001.

Football

The team was founded in 1986 under the name Boltafélag Ísafjarðar, or BÍ for short.

Volleyball

Men's volleyball

History
In 2019, the men's team was promoted to the top-tier Mizuno League for the first time in its history. In March 2023, the team advanced to the Icelandic Cup final for the first time.

Titles
Division I (2):
2017, 2019

Women's volleyball

Titles
Division II (1):
2015 (as Skellur)

References

 
Multi-sport clubs in Iceland